Phalonidia lepidana is a species of moth of the family Tortricidae. It is found in eastern North America, where it has been recorded from Illinois, Indiana, Iowa, Kentucky, Maine, Massachusetts, Minnesota, North Carolina, Ohio, Ontario, Pennsylvania, Quebec, Tennessee and Wisconsin.

The wingspan is 12–13 mm. Adults have been recorded on wing from May to August.

References

Moths described in 1860
Phalonidia